Thunder Bridge or Thunderbridge is a hamlet and bridge in the civil parish of Kirkburton, in the Kirklees district, in the county of West Yorkshire, England. It is near the A629 road and Stocksmoor railway station. Its post town is Huddersfield. It has a pub called the Woodman Inn. The bridge is a Grade II listed building which is a road bridge over Shepley Dike.

History 
Thunder Bridge was also known as "Founder Bridge".

See also
Listed buildings in Kirkburton

References

Hamlets in West Yorkshire
Bridges in West Yorkshire
Grade II listed buildings in West Yorkshire
Kirkburton